HMS Pyramus was a protected cruiser of the Royal Navy. There were eleven "Third class" protected cruisers in the class, which was designed by Sir William White. While well armed for their size, they were  primarily workhorses for the overseas fleet on "police" duties and did not serve with the main battlefleet.

They displaced 2,135 tons, had a crew complement of 224 men and were armed with eight QF 4 inch (102 mm, 25 pounder) guns, eight 3-pounder guns, three machine guns, and two 18 inch (457 mm) torpedo tubes.

HMS Pyramus was laid down at Palmers Shipbuilding and Iron Company, Jarrow in May 1896, and launched on 15 May 1897.

She served in various colonial posts, including in the Mediterranean Fleet in 1901–02. Commander Alfred Ernest Albert Grant was appointed in command on 2 August 1901. In October 1902 she was reported to be visiting Suda Bay at Crete.

In 1914 she formed part of the escort for the New Zealand Force which occupied German Samoa (now Samoa). In July 1915 she was present at the Rufiji river delta action when the monitors  and  destroyed the German cruiser .

She was sold for scrap on 21 April 1920.

Commanding officers
 Commander John Michael de Robeck - in March 1901
 Commander Arthur Ernest Albert Grant - 2 August 1901

Notes

References
 World War I Naval Combat webpage  
 Miramar Ship Index listing
 Imperial War Museum  Book of the War at Sea 1914–1918.
 Gardiner, Robert, ed. Conways All the Worlds Fighting Ships 1860-1905. New York: Mayflower Books Inc., 1979. .

 

Pelorus-class cruisers of the Royal Navy
Ships built on the River Tyne
1897 ships
World War I cruisers of the United Kingdom